SC Kuopio Futis-98 (abbreviated SC KuFu-98 or KuFu-98) is a football club from Kuopio, Finland. The club was formed in 1998 and their home ground is Savon Sanomat Areena.

Background 

SC KuFu-98 was established in 1998, the club's inaugural meeting being attended by Leo Pohjolainen, Jarmo Hämäläinen, Heikki Kärkkäinen, Markku Korhonen, Pekka Toivanen, Janne Koskinen and Mikko Kolehmainen. The players for the first season came mainly from the Airakselan Yrityksen sports club.

The club began their competitive matches in the Nelonen (Fourth Division). After their first season they gained promotion to the Kolmonen (Third Division) where they have subsequently played most of their football. The one exception was in 2003 when they have played one season in the Kakkonen (Second Division), the third tier of Finnish football.

Since 2015 KuFu-98 acts as a farm club of Veikkausliiga club KuPS.

Well-known former players are Yrjö Happonen, Atik Ismail, Pele Koljonen, Janne Savolainen and Freddy Adu.

Season to season

Club Structure 

Soccer Club Kuopio Futis-98 run one team. The club does not have a junior section.

2010 season 

SC KuFu-98 is competing in the Kolmonen administered by the Itä-Suomi SPL and Keski-Suomi SPL. This is the fourth highest tier in the Finnish football system. In 2009 the team finished in second place in the Kolmonen.

Footnotes

External links 
 Official Club Website
 KuFu-98 on Finnish Wikipedia
 Suomen Cup

Football clubs in Finland
Kuopio
1998 establishments in Finland